Osvaldo Pangrazio Kullak (born 7 November 1957) is a former football striker that currently works as a traumatologist.

Career

Football
Pangrazio started his career at Presidente Hayes and made his debut in 1977 against Olimpia. Hayes was already relegated in 1977 and so he went on to play for Nacional in 1978 before going abroad to Mexico and Colombia to play for CD Veracruz and Deportivo Pereira respectively. In 1981, he returned to Paraguay to play for Guaraní and a year later he was signed by Olimpia where he spent most of his career winning several championships and becoming a fan favorite. His last club was Cerro Porteño.

Medicine
While being a footballer, Pangrazio attended medical school and graduated in 1986. In 1987, he traveled to Bochum, Germany to focus on his specialization (traumatology). He came back to Paraguay in 1997 and worked in the medical staff of Club Olimpia until 1999. Currently, he works as a traumatologist for the Migone and the San Roque hospitals in Asunción and is part of the Medical Sports Committee of the Paraguayan Football Association.

Titles

References

1957 births
Living people
Paraguay international footballers
Paraguayan footballers
Paraguayan Primera División players
Categoría Primera A players
Club Nacional footballers
C.D. Veracruz footballers
Club Guaraní players
Club Olimpia footballers
Cerro Porteño players
Deportivo Pereira footballers
Expatriate footballers in Mexico
Expatriate footballers in Colombia
Club Presidente Hayes footballers
Association football forwards